The 1966 Dallas Cowboys season was the seventh for the franchise in the National Football League. This was the first of six consecutive division titles for the Cowboys. They finished the regular season at 10–3–1, their first winning record as a franchise and first Eastern Conference title. They hosted the NFL Championship Game at the Cotton Bowl, but lost to the defending champion Green Bay Packers, who went on to win the first Super Bowl two weeks later.

Quarterback Don Meredith had the best season of his career throwing for 2,805 yards, 24 touchdowns (both career highs) and 12 interceptions.

NFL Draft

Schedule

Conference opponents are in bold text
 This year was the first time the Dallas Cowboys played on Thanksgiving Day

Week 8 vs Steelers

Week 10 at Redskins

Don Meredith played through a broken rib

Week 12 vs Browns

Postseason

NFL Championship Game

Green Bay took an early 14–0 lead on two first-quarter scores; a 17-yard touchdown pass from Bart Starr to Elijah Pitts and an 18-yard fumble return by Jim Grabowski on the ensuing kickoff.  The Cowboys tied the score with two touchdowns towards the end of the quarter.

Starr's third touchdown pass of the game gave the Packers a 34–20 lead with 5:20 left in the game, but the Cowboys responded with a 68-yard touchdown pass from Don Meredith to Frank Clarke.  Dallas advanced to the Green Bay 22-yard line on their next drive, when a pass interference penalty gave the Cowboys a first down at the Packer 2-yard line.  But Green Bay's Tom Brown intercepted a Meredith pass in the end zone with 28 seconds left to play to preserve the victory for the Packers.

Standings

Season recap
With the growth in popularity of televised NFL games, the league began looking for a second team in addition to the Detroit Lions, to host an annual Thanksgiving Day game. Every team turned down the offer, except for the Dallas Cowboys. General Manager Tex Schramm recognized this as an opportunity for the franchise to increase its popularity and establish its own Thanksgiving Day game tradition.

In 1966, the Cowboys who had been founded six years earlier, adopted the practice of hosting Thanksgiving games. It is widely rumored that the Cowboys sought a guarantee that they would regularly host Thanksgiving games as a condition of their very first one (since games on days other than Sunday were uncommon at the time and thus high attendance was not a certainty). Since then, the two "traditional" Thanksgiving Day pro football games have been in Detroit and Dallas.

Roster

Awards and honors
 Don Meredith, Bert Bell Award

References

External links
It Was 1966 . . .
1934 - THE FIRST NFL GAME IS BROADCAST NATIONALLY

Dallas Cowboys
Dallas Cowboys seasons
Dallas Cowboys